Hammy Down Versace is an American rapper from Prestbury, Illinois. He started his career as 'Fat Ghost' in Wisconsin in 2008. Since then, Versace has moved to Los Angeles and began recording his single "Ferocious" at a recording studio in Hollywood.

References

Musicians from Milwaukee
Musicians from Los Angeles
American rappers
Living people
Temple University alumni
1985 births
People from Kane County, Illinois
People from Campbellsport, Wisconsin
21st-century American rappers